Stolypin may refer to:

 Pyotr Stolypin (1862–1911), Prime Minister of Russian, leader of the third Duma (1906–1911)
 Stolypin reform, a series of changes to Imperial Russia's agricultural sector instituted during the leadership of Pyotr Stolypin
 Stolypin's necktie redirects to Pyotr Stolypin
 Stolypin car, a type of railroad carriage in the Russian Empire and Soviet Union